Stronsay Airport  is located  northeast by north of Kirkwall Airport on Stronsay, Orkney Islands, Scotland.

Stronsay Aerodrome has a CAA Ordinary Licence (Number P540) that allows flights for the public transport of passengers or for flying instruction as authorised by the licensee (Orkney Islands Council). The aerodrome is not licensed for night use.

Airline and destinations

References

External links
Orkney Islands Council

Airports in Orkney
Stronsay